

NGC 681 (also known as the Little Sombrero Galaxy) is an intermediate spiral galaxy in the constellation of Cetus, located approximately 66.5 million light-years from Earth. The name Little Sombrero Galaxy is a reference to a much larger and earlier observed sombrero-like galaxy designated M104, or the Sombrero Galaxy.

Observation history 
NGC 681 was discovered by the German-born British astronomer William Herschel on 28 November 1785 and was later also observed by William's son, John Herschel. John Louis Emil Dreyer, compiler of the first New General Catalogue of Nebulae and Clusters of Stars, described NGC 681 as being a "pretty faint, considerably large, round, small (faint) star 90 arcsec to [the] west" that becomes "gradually a little brighter [in the] middle".

Physical characteristics 
The Little Sombrero Galaxy shares many structural similarities with its namesake, M104, although it is smaller, less luminous, and less massive. Its thin, dusty disc is seen almost perfectly edge-on and features a small, very bright nucleus in the center of a very pronounced bulge. Distinctly unlike M104, NGC 681's disc contains many H II regions, where star formation is likely to be occurring. The galaxy has a mass of  M☉, a mass-to-light ratio of 3.6 , and a spiral pattern which is asymmetrical.

See also 
 Sombrero Galaxy
 Messier object
 List of spiral galaxies

References

External links 
 

Galaxies discovered in 1785
Intermediate spiral galaxies
Cetus (constellation)
Discoveries by William Herschel
681
006671